Mannheimer is a German language surname, meaning a person from Mannheim. Spelling variants include Manheimer and Mannerheim. It may refer to:

Albert Mannheimer (1913–1972), American writer
Anna Mannheimer (born 1963), Swedish journalist
Carin Mannheimer (1934–2014), Swedish writer
Clara Mannheimer (born 1968), Swedish journalist
Fritz Mannheimer (1890–1939), German banker
Isaac Noah Mannheimer (1793–1865), Austrian rabbi
Ken Manheimer (born 1959), American computer scientist
Louise Herschman Mannheimer (1845-1920), Czech-American writer
Max Mannheimer (1920–2016), Czech writer
Renato Mannheimer (born 1947), Italian sociologist
Sara Mannheimer (born 1967), Swedish novelist

See also
Mannheimer Rosengarten, a venue in Mannheim
Mannheim (disambiguation)

Germanic-language surnames
German-language surnames
Jewish surnames
Mannheim
Yiddish-language surnames